Marin de Viry (born 30 January 1962, Boulogne-Billancourt) is a French writer and literary critic. A member of the management committee of the Revue des deux Mondes, he is also a professor at Sciences Po in Paris and was Dominique de Villepin's  during his campaign for the 2012 French presidential election

Bibliography 
1996: .
2008: .
2010: .
2012: .

References

External links 
 Marin de Viry on Revue des deux Mondes
 Marin de Viry on P+sitive Planet
 Marin de Viry on France Culture
 Interview de Marin de Viry on Vimeo

21st-century French non-fiction writers
French literary critics
20th-century French essayists
21st-century French essayists
People from Boulogne-Billancourt
1962 births
Living people